Mabodale is a village in Gampaha District of Sri Lanka. Paddy and betel cultivation had been the main source of income for many families for decades.

Climate
Mabodale belongs to the wet zone of Sri Lanka where ample amount of rain is received throughout the year. The average temperature is 30 degrees Celsius during day time and high humidity is sometimes experienced.

Places of interest
The main physical landmark in Mabodale is its water reservoir, Mabodale Weva. The catchment area is mainly large private lands with coconut cultivation. 

Mabodale has four main Buddhist temples.

Transportation
Mabodale is accessible from surrounding suburban areas by road. The village is served by two buses running between Divulapitiya and Veyangoda regularly. Mabodale is connected to the main railway network via Veyangoda, where all of the express trains stop.

Schools
The village has one government school.

See also
Dewalapola

Populated places in Gampaha District
Grama Niladhari divisions of Sri Lanka